is an unfinished, 1998, 2D versus fighting arcade game developed by the Steel Hearts development team and published by Psikyo. It was Psikyo's second attempt in the 2D versus fighting genre after Battle K-Road.

A "complete edition" of the game by Zerodiv (founded by former Psikyo programmer Keiyuki Haragami) was to be released for arcades and later consoles but this looks to not be happening.

Gameplay
Fallen Angels is a two dimensional fighting game that takes a somewhat realistic approach in its gameplay, with super powered moves and with fluid movements animated using real motions (which was also featured in Art of Fighting 3). Projectile attacks are limited to three characters, atypical for the game's genre. The game featured eight playable characters: Cool, Harry Ness, Yuiren, Yuiran, Tarō, Torao Onigawara, Ruccio Roche and Haiji Mibu. The boss characters are Trigger and Carlos.

Plot 
The game takes place in 2010, ten years after a massive earthquake that shook an unnamed city. The earthquake severed the city from its surrounding areas, leaving criminals to run as they please. The game revolves around the inhabitants fighting against one another to accomplish their goals.

Development
Information about the game's development and fate are scarce, though it is widely reported that it was released without being completed.  The developers of the game then reportedly moved back to SNK, supported by the observation that many of the characters bear striking resemblances to fighters that later appeared in SNK's The King of Fighters series and Garou: Mark of the Wolves. Game director Mitsuo Kodama was unhappy that the game's style influenced other rival companies (who left to found K2 LLC, later acquired by Capcom) In The King of Fighters '99, the boss character Krizalid resembles one of the characters and has a theme song titled "Dear Falling Angel".

Unfinished sprites for four unplayable characters have been found in the ROMs of the game, speculating that they were meant to be playable characters. They consisted of a female treasure hunter, a shirtless male brawler, a businessman, and a naked male with no genitals.

The once upcoming complete version of the game was to feature the four unused characters, along with many adjustments.

Reception 
In Japan, Game Machine listed The Fallen Angels on their May 1, 1998 issue as being the eleventh most-successful arcade game among machine operators surveyed during that two week period.

See also
List of fighting games

References

External links
The Fallen Angels at The Large Cult Fighting Game March 

The Fallen Angels at arcade-history
 Daraku Tenshi screenshots
 Daraku Tenshi Complete Unofficial Site 
 "Daraku Tenshi:...Beta?" - beta analysis article detailing all the lost content from game at Unseen64

1998 video games
Arcade video games
Arcade-only video games
City Connection franchises
Psikyo games
Fighting games
Video games developed in Japan
Video games scored by Kumi Tanioka
Multiplayer and single-player video games